Sarchí is a canton in the Alajuela province of Costa Rica. The head city is in Sarchí Norte district.

Toponymy  
The Sarchí word means Open Field in the Huetar language of the Huetar people that once inhabited the area.

On 7 August 2019, by Law 9658, the canton changed its previous name from Valverde Vega to Sarchí.

History 
Sarchí was created on 26 October 1949 by decree 766. It  was originally named Valverde Vega in honor of Dr. Carlos Luis Valverde Vega, a medic and founder of the Unión Médica Nacional (National Medical Union) after more than forty years of struggle. The members of the board that worked to create it were Samuel Alfaro Alpízar, Efraím Zamora Castro, Daube Alfaro Castro, Pedro Alfaro Zamora, Hebly Inkseter Soto, Otoniel Alfaro Alfaro, Elécer Pérez Conejo, who are known today as its founders. The canton was inaugurated on 1 January 1950.

Geography 

Sarchí has an area of  km² and a mean elevation of  metres.

The elongated canton lies between the Molino and Toro rivers on the northwest and the Sarchí River on the southeast. It reaches northward into a beautiful high valley of the Cordillera Central (Central Mountain Range) between the Poás and Platanar volcanoes.

Districts 
The canton of Sarchí is subdivided into the following districts:
 Sarchí Norte
 Sarchí Sur
 Toro Amarillo
 San Pedro
 Rodríguez

Demographics 

For the 2011 census, Sarchí had a population of  inhabitants.

Transportation

Road transportation 
The canton is covered by the following road routes:

References 

Cantons of Alajuela Province
Populated places in Alajuela Province